Urška Bravec (born 14 December 1996) is a Slovenian professional racing cyclist, who most recently rode for UCI Women's WorldTeam .

References

External links
 

1996 births
Living people
Slovenian female cyclists
Place of birth missing (living people)
European Games competitors for Slovenia
Cyclists at the 2019 European Games